Paula Lewellen is an American Republican politician from Bedford, Massachusetts. She represented the Fifth Middlesex district in the Massachusetts House of Representatives from 1977 to 1978.

References

Year of birth missing
Year of death missing
Members of the Massachusetts House of Representatives
Women state legislators in Massachusetts
20th-century American women politicians
20th-century American politicians
People from Bedford, Massachusetts